Edward Mosberg (January 6, 1926 – September 21, 2022) was a Polish-American Holocaust survivor, educator, and philanthropist. During the Holocaust, he was held by the Nazis from 14 years of age in Kraków Ghetto, Kraków-Płaszów concentration camp, Auschwitz concentration camp,  Mauthausen concentration camp, and a slave labor camp in Linz, Austria, that was liberated by the US Army in 1945. Nearly all of his family were murdered in the Holocaust.

In 2019, Mosberg was awarded Poland’s highest civilian honor by Polish President Andrzej Duda, the Order of Merit of the Republic of Poland. In 2020, American football player DeSean Jackson, who had made an antisemitic post on social media which he later apologized for, accepted an invitation from the then-94-year-old Mosberg to join him on a visit to the Auschwitz concentration camp, to learn about the Holocaust.

Early life
Mosberg was born in Kraków, Poland, to Bronislawa and Ludwig, and was Jewish. His parents owned a department store, and prayed at the Wolf Popper Synagogue.  His two sisters were Halina and Karolina.

The Holocaust

In 1939 when Mosberg was 13 years old, Nazi Germany invaded his hometown. In 1940, one year later, the Kraków Ghetto, a Nazi ghetto, was created during the German occupation of Poland in World War II. His immediate family, grandparents, cousins, and aunt were moved into one small apartment there. In 1941, his father was killed in a round-up. In 1942, his grandmother, aunts, and cousins were deported to Belzec concentration camp in German-occupied Poland.

In 1943, the Kraków Ghetto was liquidated, and the remaining Mosberg family was moved to the Kraków-Płaszów concentration camp in Płaszów just south of Kraków, a Nazi concentration camp operated by the SS, which had been constructed on the grounds of two former Jewish cemeteries. Mosberg witnessed a great number of atrocities committed by SS camp commandant Amon Göth, who was later tried, convicted, and hanged as a war criminal.

In May 1944, Mosberg’s mother and sisters were sent to the Nazi death camp of Auschwitz concentration camp in southern Poland. Auschwitz was the largest Nazi concentration camp, and over a million Jews were killed there between 1940 and 1945. His mother was killed in an Auschwitz gas chamber, and then her body was sent to its crematorium. Mosberg was deported a few days later, first to Auschwitz.

He was then deported to the Mauthausen concentration camp in Austria, where Mosberg performed slave labor. In Mauthausen, prisoners were forced to work in a quarry, pulling boulders as heavy as 110 pounds up 186 steps from morning until night, whipped by Nazi guards. Mosberg said: "If you stopped for a moment, the SS either shot you or pushed you off the cliff to your death." Mosberg was next sent to a slave labor camp in Linz, Austria. The camp was liberated by the U.S. Army on May 5, 1945.

Nearly all of Mosberg's family were murdered during the Holocaust, including his parents and sisters.

Life after the Holocaust
Mosberg was then sent to a hospital in Italy to recover from tuberculosis. In Italy, he reconnected with Cesia (Cecile) Storch, whom he had earlier met in the camps. She had been imprisoned with his sisters.

Cecile (nicknamed Cesia; née Storch) Mosberg, was born in Kraków and had survived Auschwitz. Many of her family members had also been killed.  Mosberg and Cecile had both been liberated from German concentration camps by American soldiers.

After liberation, Mosberg returned to Poland for a short amount of time, but encountered strong antisemitism and he and Cecile then moved to Belgium. Mosberg married Cecile in Brussels, Belgium, in 1947.

They then immigrated to the United States in 1951 with their 18-month-old-daughter Beatrice, and lived in East Harlem, New York. Thereafter they had two more children, Louise (in 1953) and Caroline (in 1966), and as of 2016 had seven grandchildren and two grand-grandchildren.  Cecile died at 92 years of age in 2020, after the two had been married for 72 years.

In the United States, Mosberg first worked small jobs, and ultimately became a real-estate developer. The family moved to Parsippany, New Jersey, and later lived in Morris Plains, New Jersey.

Holocaust awareness promoter
Mosberg devoted the last years of his life to Holocaust education, was one of the biggest supporters of the International March of the Living (often attending the march wearing his original concentration camp uniform) and appeared in two documentary films. He served as honorary chairman of From the Depths, an organization dedicated to “preserving the memory of the Holocaust and to give a name to those who were brutally murdered in the dark days of the Holocaust." He was committed to strengthening Polish-Jewish dialogue and relations, and to recognizing the Polish Righteous Among the Nations, those Polish non-Jews who risked their lives for altruistic reasons to save Jews from the Nazis during the Holocaust.

2006–19
In 2006, Mosberg donated a Torah that was hidden from the Nazis to the Mount Freedom Jewish Center. In 2007, Mosberg and his wife received the Yad Vashem Remembrance Award.

In 2009, Mosberg was one of half a dozen people who met with Pope Benedict XVI at the Yad Vashem Holocaust memorial in Jerusalem, Israel.

In 2015 his story was featured in the documentary Witness: Passing the Torch of Holocaust Memory to New Generations. In 2017 he was in the documentary film Destination Unknown.

In early May 2018, Mosberg co-signed a letter asking Jersey City, New Jersey, Mayor Steven Fulop not to remove the Katyń Memorial from Exchange Place in the city, writing: "The memory of the Katyn massacre is an important part of the memory and memories of the Holocaust and we encourage you to reconsider your decision to remove this monument." On December 20, 2018, the nine-member Jersey City Council voted unanimously to adopt an ordinance that the monument remain where it stands in Exchange Place “in perpetuity”.

In June 2019, Polish President Andrzej Duda honored Mosberg with the Commander's Cross of the Order of Merit of the Republic of Poland.  It was given to Mosberg in recognition of his having developed Polish-Jewish dialogue, and his having promoted knowledge about the role of Polish people in saving Jews during the Holocaust. Accepting the award in Kraków, Mosberg  said: "I accept this award on behalf of myself, my wife, my children and grandchildren, and most importantly, in honor of my mother, father, siblings and six million Jews, brutally murdered by the Nazis during the Holocaust."

Mosberg was the subject of a painting by artist David Kassan that appeared in September–December 2019 in an exhibition co-curated by the USC Shoah Foundation and USC’s Fisher Museum of Art, named "Facing Survival".

That same year, he was diagnosed with blood cancer. Mosberg said he did not fear death, however, because: "First, I already beat death once after the war when I had final stage tuberculosis – and I can do it again. Second, I died already 70 years ago when the Germans murdered my whole family..."

2020–22
Presenting Mosberg with the Ner Tamid Award for his global philanthropic work in February 2020, Consul General of Poland Adrian Kubicki said that the Polish and Jewish communities “have shared some beautiful moments and we also share some of the most painful memories," and that Mosberg was "an ambassador of truth” who has “done so much good around the world” in ensuring another tragedy like the Holocaust “never again happens to the Jewish nation, the Polish nation or any other nation.”

In July 2020, American football player DeSean Jackson, who had posted social media messages—which he later apologized for—citing an anti-semitic quote that he thought was a quote from Hitler, accepted an invitation from the then-94-year-old Mosberg to join him on a visit to the Auschwitz concentration camp in Poland. Mosberg said: "Jackson was very respectful. I would like to say God Bless Mr. Jackson for accepting my invitation."

Mosberg died in New Jersey, at 96 years of age, on September 21, 2022. 
Polish President Andrzej Duda and his wife attended Mosberg's funeral, and Duda announced that he was awarding  Mosberg the Grand Cross of the Order of Merit of the Republic of Poland, the highest Polish award in its class. It was awarded in recognition of Mosberg's achievements in advancing Polish-Jewish dialogue and developing cooperation between nations, and for preserving the memory of and communicating what happened in the Holocaust. Duda said Mosberg was a great and brave man both as a Jew and as a Pole, astutely testified about the complex history of the Jews in Poland, and loved Poland.
 
Writing of Mosberg's death, Polish Consul General Adrian Kubicki wrote that Mosberg was: "the most wonderful man I have ever met. He was a Holocaust Survivor, noble man and a great Polish patriot... My personal mentor. Irreplaceable."

See also
Dimensions in Testimony, a collection of 3D interactive genocide survivor testimonies, produced by USC Shoah Foundation, testimony of Edward Mosberg, June 10–14, 2018.

References

External links
" Edward Mosberg on Why He Tells His Story; Holocaust survivor Edward Mosberg explains why he feels it is so important for him to tell his story," USC Shoah Foundation (video).
"Edward Mosberg Speaks at the March of the Living 2022," April 28, 2022 (video).

1926 births
2022 deaths
20th-century American businesspeople
20th-century American Jews
20th-century Polish businesspeople
20th-century Polish Jews
21st-century American businesspeople
21st-century American Jews
21st-century American philanthropists
21st-century Polish businesspeople
21st-century Polish Jews
American expatriates in Belgium
American people of Polish-Jewish descent
American real estate businesspeople
Auschwitz concentration camp survivors
Businesspeople from Kraków
Jewish American philanthropists
Kraków Ghetto inmates
Kraków-Płaszów concentration camp survivors
Mauthausen concentration camp survivors
Nazi-era ghetto inmates
People from Morris Plains, New Jersey
People from Parsippany-Troy Hills, New Jersey
Polish emigrants to the United States
Polish expatriates in Belgium
Polish philanthropists
Recipients of the Order of Merit of the Republic of Poland
The Holocaust in Poland
Victims of human rights abuses